Eric Oscar Sigvard Ny (15 October 1909 – 2 September 1945) was a Swedish middle-distance runner. He competed in the 1500 m event at the 1932 and 1936 Summer Olympics and finished in fifth and eleventh place, respectively. He placed fourth in the 800 m at the 1934 European Championships. Ny died in a sailing accident, aged 35.

References

1909 births
1945 deaths
Swedish male middle-distance runners
Olympic athletes of Sweden
Athletes (track and field) at the 1932 Summer Olympics
Athletes (track and field) at the 1936 Summer Olympics
Boating accident deaths
Accidental deaths in Sweden